The Marnes de Châlins (French for Châlins Marl) is a Late Triassic (Norian to Rhaetian) geologic formation in France. Dinosaur remains are among the fossils that have been recovered from the formation, although none have yet been referred to a specific genus.

Fossil content 
The formation has provided the following fossils:
 Reptiles
 Plateosaurus sp.
 Gresslyosaurus cf. plieningeri
 ?Prosauropoda indet.
 Fish
 Grozonodon candaui
 Lissodus lepagei
 L. minimus
 ?Gyrolepis sp.
 Ptychoceratodus rectangulus

See also 
 List of dinosaur-bearing rock formations
 List of stratigraphic units with indeterminate dinosaur fossils

References

Bibliography

Further reading 
 G. Cuny, M. Martin, R. Rauscher and J. Mazin. 1998. A new neoselachian shark from the Upper Triassic of Grozon (Jura, France). Geological Magazine 135(5):657-668
 A. F. d. Lapparent. 1967. Les dinosaures de France [The dinosaurs of France]. Sciences 51:4-19
 M. J. Henry. 1876. L'Infralias dans la Franche-Comté [The Lower Lias of Franche-Comté]. Mémoires de la Société d'Émulation du Doubs, 4e série 10:287-486

Geologic formations of France
Triassic System of Europe
Triassic France
Norian Stage
Rhaetian Stage
Marl formations
Paleontology in France